The 2016–17 Sydney Sixers season is the club's sixth consecutive season in the Big Bash League (BBL).

Players

Squad
Players with international caps are listed in bold.

Big Bash League

Ladder

Results by round

Matches

Home attendance

References

External links
Official site

Sydney Sixers seasons